An Asian Championship is a top level international sports competition between Asian athletes or sports teams representing their respective countries or professional sports clubs.

List of Championships (Summer Olympic Sports) 
Aquatics

 Asian Swimming Championships
Archery

 Asian Archery Championships
Athletics
 Asian Athletics Championships

Badminton
 Badminton Asia Championships

Baseball
Baseball
 Asian Baseball Championship
 Women's Baseball Asian Cup
Softball
Asian Men's Softball Championship
Asian Women's Softball Championship

Basketball
 FIBA Asia Cup
 FIBA Women's Asia Cup

Boxing
 Asian Amateur Boxing Championships

Canoeing

 Asian Canoeing Championships

Chess

 Asian Chess Championship

Cycling

 Asian Cycling Championships
Fencing
 Asian Fencing Championships

Field hockey
 Men's Hockey Asia Cup
 Women's Hockey Asia Cup

Football

 AFC Asian Cup
 AFC Women's Asia Cup
Gymnastics

 Asian Gymnastics Championships
Handball
 Asian Men's Handball Championship
 Asian Women's Handball Championship

Judo
 Asian Judo Championships

Karate
 Asian Karate Championships

Rowing

 Asian Rowing Championships
Rugby 
Rugby Union
 Asia Rugby Championship
 Asia Rugby Women's Championship
Rugby Sevens
Asian Rugby Sevens Series
 Asian Rugby Women's Sevens Series

Sailing

 Asian Championships in Sailing
Shooting

 Asian Shooting Championships
Sport climbing
 IFSC Climbing Asian Championships
Surfing

 Asian Surfing Championships
Table tennis
 Asian Table Tennis Championships
Taekwondo
 Asian Taekwondo Championships

Volleyball
Volleyball
 Asian Men's Volleyball Championship
 Asian Women's Volleyball Championship
Beach Volleyball

 Asian Beach Volleyball Championships
Water polo
 Asian Water Polo Championship

Weightlifting
 Asian Weightlifting Championships

Wrestling
 Asian Wrestling Championships

See also 

 Asian Games, a multi-sport event between competitors from all nations in Asia
 Championship
 World championship
 African Championship
 European Championship
 European Junior Championships (disambiguation)
 Oceania Championship
 Pan American Championship
 Central American Championships (disambiguation)
 North American Championship
 Canadian Championships
 South American Championship

Sport in Asia